The abolition of monarchy and anti-royalism is a legislative or revolutionary movement to abolish monarchical elements in government, usually hereditary.

Abolition of absolutist monarchy in favor of limited government under constitutional monarchy is a less radical form of anti-royalism that has succeeded in some nations that still retain monarchs, such as the United Kingdom, Spain, Thailand.

Abolition has been carried out in various ways, including via abdication leading to the extinction of the monarchy, legislative reform, revolution, coup d'état, and decolonisation. Abolition became more frequent in the 20th century, with the number of monarchies in Europe falling from 22 to 12 between 1914 and 2015, and the number of republics rising from 4 to 34. Decolonisation and independence have resulted in an abolition of monarchies in a number of former colonies such as those created by the United Kingdom.

Motivations for abolition include egalitarianism and anti-class views, eliminating a rival system potentially opposed to another incoming system (as had occurred in Romania in 1947), opposition to undemocratic and hereditary institutions, perception of monarchy as anachronistic or outdated, and opposition to a particular monarch or dynasty. In many colonies and former colonies, abolishing the influence of the monarchy of a colonising state is considered part of decolonisation. In many Commonwealth realms, the monarchy may be viewed as a foreign institution running counter to the national identity or national sovereignty.

In the 21st century, some countries that are monarchies have significant republican movements, such as Spain and Australia.

Since the beginning of the 20th century, restorations of monarchies have been comparatively rare. Examples are the monarchy of Spain, which since 1947 had been nominally a regency with a vacant throne but the Bourbon dynasty was restored in 1975; the reinstatement in 1991 of the Emir of Kuwait following abolition in 1990 and the Gulf War; and a 1993 transition of Cambodia from a Marxist-Leninist republic to an elective monarchy.

Ancient world

Classical Athens 
The city-state of Athens was ruled by monarchs in a period before the establishment of Athenian Democracy. Most of this is either mythical or semi-historical. The Athenian monarchy was abolished and replaced with lifetime archons around 1068 BC, whose power was reduced over many years.

Roman Kingdom/Republic 
The Roman Republic was established after the overthrow of the seventh king of Rome, Lucius Tarquinius Superbus, in 509 BC, after their disrespect for roman customs and senate as well as use of violence to control Rome

Political theory

Civil War and English Republic 

Under the leadership of Oliver Cromwell, in 1649, King Charles I was tried for high treason, convicted and executed. This marked the conclusion of the English Civil War which resulted in the Parliament of England overthrowing the English monarchy, and initiating a period of an English republic (known as the Wars of the Three Kingdoms). After eleven years, in 1660, a limited monarchy was restored but moderated by an independent Parliament.

In the Kingdom of England, the Glorious Revolution of 1688 furthered the constitutional monarchy, restricted by laws such as the Bill of Rights 1689 and the Act of Settlement 1701. At the same time, in Scotland, the Convention of Estates enacted the Claim of Right Act 1689, which placed similar limits on the Scottish monarchy.

Atlantic Revolutions

American 

Organized anti-monarchism in what is now the United States developed out of a gradual revolution that began in 1765, as colonists resisted a stamp tax through boycott and condemnation of tax officials. While they were subject to the authority of the Parliament of Great Britain (as the monarchy was a limited monarchy since 1660), the North American citizens increasingly clashed with the Parliament that did not provide seats for parliamentary representatives from North America. With the Declaration of Independence in 1776, anti-monarchical propaganda resulted in violent protests that systematically removed symbols of monarchy. For instance, an equestrian statue of George III in New York City was toppled. Parliamentary loyalists were particularly affected by partisan attacks, with tens of thousands leaving for British Canada. Property that remained was confiscated by each of thirteen newly created States through newly passed laws. Artifacts from the colonial period depicting the British monarchy are seldom found in the United States. However, not all sentiment equated to anti-monarchism. A normality of a monarchy at the head of a polity remained, that some Americans saw a presidency in monarchical terms, a Caesar of the republic, was an early debate in the new republic.

Haitian

French 

One of the most significant abolitions of monarchy in history—along with the Dutch Republic of 1581–1795—involved the Ancien Régime in 1792 during the French Revolution. The French monarchy was later restored several times with differing levels of authority. Napoleon, initially a hero of the Republican revolution, crowned himself emperor in 1804, only to be replaced by the Bourbon Restoration in 1815, which in turn was replaced by the more liberal July Monarchy in 1830.

The 1848 Revolution was a clearer anti-monarchic uprising that replaced the succession of royal leaders with the short-lived Second French Republic. Louis Napoleon Bonaparte established the Second French Empire (1852–1870), retaining republican aspects while placing himself in the center of the state until the losses in the Franco-Prussian War led to his fall, resulting in the French Third Republic and the definitive end of the monarchy in France. Monarchism, which had held a majority in the National Assembly after the 1871 election, slowly fizzled out over the course of the rest of the century.

19th century

Africa 

Madagascar

The monarchy of Madagascar, known as the Merina Kingdom, came to an end in 1897 when France made it a colony and overthrew Queen Ranavalona III.

Zimbabwe

In 1629, the Mwenemutapa attempted to throw out the Portuguese. He failed and in turn he himself was overthrown, leading to the Portuguese installation of Mavura Mhande Felipe on the throne. In 1917, Mambo Chioko, the last king of the dynasty, was killed in battle against the Portuguese.

Americas 

Mexico

The First Mexican Empire existed from the September 1821 Declaration of Independence until the emperor's abdication in March 1823. The Provisional Government took power and the First Mexican Republic was proclaimed in 1824. Due to French intervention under Napoleon III, the Second Mexican Empire lasted from 1864 to 1867, when it collapsed and its Emperor, Maximilian I of Mexico, was executed.

Brazil

In Brazil, the monarchy was formally established in 1815 through the United Kingdom of Portugal, Brazil and the Algarves (of which the Kingdom of Brazil was a constituent state), it evolved into the Empire of Brazil in 1822, and was abolished in 1889, when Emperor Pedro II was overthrown by a republican military coup (the status of the republic was confirmed by a plebiscite in 1993 that resulted in 86% of the votes to the republican government).

Asia 

Burma

The monarchy of Burma was abolished in 1885 when the last king, Thibaw Min, lost his throne and the country was annexed by Britain.

South Asia

In 1858 the Mughal Empire came to an end after losing a war against Britain, and its Emperor, Bahadur Shah II, lost his throne.

Europe 

Italy

Between 1859 and 1861, four monarchies in Southern Europe ceased to exist (Parma, Modena, Tuscany and the Two Sicilies) when they all became part of the new Kingdom of Italy.

Spain

In Spain monarchy was abolished from 1873 to 1874 by the First Spanish Republic, but then restored until 1931.

Pacific 

Hawaii

In 1893 foreign business leaders overthrew Queen Liliʻuokalani of the Kingdom of Hawaii. They established a republic, which was annexed by the United States in 1898.

Tahiti

The monarchy of Tahiti came to an end in 1880 when France made it a colony and overthrew King Pōmare V.

Manu'a

After ceding sovereignty of the Manu'a islands of modern-day American Samoa to the United States in 1904, the last King of Manu'a, Tui Manu'a Elisara, died on 2 July 1909. All attempts to revive the position since his death have been met with opposition by the United States Government.

20th century

Nationalism

China 

The monarchy of China ceased to exist in 1912 when the Xinhai Revolution led by Sun Yat-sen succeeded in overthrowing the young Xuantong Emperor; this marked the end of the Qing dynasty and the start of the Republic of China. In 1915, Yuan Shikai briefly proclaimed the Empire of China with himself as the emperor; the regime failed to gain legitimacy and collapsed three months later. In 1917, the Qing loyalist Zhang Xun sought to revive the Qing dynasty and briefly reinstalled the Xuantong Emperor to the Chinese throne; this attempt is known as the "Manchu Restoration" in historiography. The monarchy in parts of China was restored through the Japanese-sponsored client state known as Manchukuo with the former Qing emperor as its leader until the final abolition in 1945.

The area of Tibet was ruled by the Ganden Phodrang government which continued through the annexation of Tibet by the People's Republic of China until the Tibetan rebellion in 1959 where the monarchy in Tibet was dissolved although it continued in exile as the Central Tibetan Administration in India.

During the Xinhai Revolution, Outer Mongolia declared independence from the Qing dynasty of China in the Mongolian Revolution of 1911. The Bogd Khanate of Mongolia was subsequently proclaimed, although the Republic of China laid claims to Outer Mongolia and was widely recognized by the international community as having sovereignty over it. In 1924, the Mongolian People's Republic was established, bringing an end to the monarchy in Mongolia.

World War I and aftermath

Russian Empire 

World War I led to perhaps the greatest number of abolition of monarchies in history. The conditions inside the Russian Empire and the poor performance in the war gave rise to a revolution which toppled the entire institution of the monarchy, followed by a second revolution against that government in October of the same year that executed Tsar (Imperator (Императоръ)) Nicholas II and implemented a Marxist-Leninist government. The Russian civil war saw various monarchist, Republican, anarchist, nationalist and socialist factions fight each other with bourgeois independence movements winning in the Baltic States, Poland and Finland and the Bolsheviks winning everywhere else.

Germany, Austria-Hungary, Ottoman Empire, Montenegro 

The defeated German, Austro-Hungarian and Ottoman empires saw the abolition of their monarchies in the close aftermath of the war, ending the reigns of Wilhelm II, Charles I and Mehmed VI respectively. The monarchs of the constituent states within the German Empire, most importantly Ludwig III of Bavaria, Frederick Augustus III of Saxony and Wilhelm II of Württemberg, soon abdicated. During the war, monarchies were planned for Poland (Kingdom of Poland), the Grand Duchy of Finland (to have a Finnish King), and Lithuania (Mindaugas II of Lithuania), with a protectorate-like suzerainty exercised by the German Empire. Both intended kings renounced their thrones after Germany's defeat in November 1918. King Nicholas I of Montenegro lost his throne when the country became a part of Yugoslavia in 1918.

World War II and aftermath

Italy, Albania, Bulgaria, Hungary, Romania, Yugoslavia, Croatia 

World War II saw another increased number of abolition of monarchies. In 1922, Benito Mussolini's March on Rome led to King Victor Emmanuel III appointing Mussolini Prime Minister. In 1939 Italy invaded Albania and removed the reigning self-proclaimed King Zog and instated their own King Victor Emmanuel III as its new monarch. Italy, along with the eastern European monarchies of Bulgaria, Hungary and Romania were forced to join with Germany by their dictators in World War II against the Kingdom of Yugoslavia, the Western allies and the Soviet Union.  When Yugoslavia fell in 1941 the Independent State of Croatia was established under a nominal monarchy, but it was in fact a one party state under Ante Pavelić and a puppet state of Nazi Germany. With the fall of Mussolini in July 1943, the monarchy in Croatia was abolished. As the Axis powers were defeated in the war, communist partisans in occupied Yugoslavia and occupied Albania seized power and ended the monarchies. Communists in Bulgaria, Hungary, and Romania removed their monarchies with strong backing by the Soviet Union, which had many troops and supporters placed there during the course of the war. Through this, Peter II of Yugoslavia, Simeon II of Bulgaria and Michael I of Romania all lost their thrones. King Victor Emmanuel III of Italy had remained King after the Fall of the Fascist regime in Italy but transferred most of his powers to his son after the Armistice of Cassibile. After Victor Emmanuel abdicated to save the monarchy, a narrow referendum in 1946 ended the short reign of his son King Umberto II and the Italian monarchy ceased to exist.

Republicanism

Australia (monarchy kept after referendum) 

In a 1999 referendum, the voters of Australia rejected a proposal to replace the constitutional monarchy with a republic with a president appointed by Parliament. The proposal was rejected in all states, with only the Australian Capital Territory voting in favor. Though polling consistently showed a majority in favour of a republic, the result of the referendum was attributed to a split among republicans between those who supported the presented model and those who supported a directly elected president.

Greece 
In the modern history of Greece, the monarchy was toppled in 1924, as a result of the National Schism and the Asia Minor Disaster. The resulting Second Hellenic Republic led a troubled existence, until a coup restored the monarchy in 1935. The subsequent dictatorial 4th of August Regime was established with the support of King George II of Greece, further delegitimizing the monarchy.

During the Axis occupation of Greece, George II nominally led the Greek government in exile, but the post-war fate of the monarchy was a major dividing issue for Greeks, especially with the rise of the pro-communist National Liberation Front (EAM) as the country's largest resistance movement. As a compromise, the issue was to be determined by a referendum after the war. In the end, the threat of a post-war communist takeover led the Venizelist republicans to ally with the monarchists; with the defeat of EAM in the Dekemvriana, the subsequent White Terror, and the outbreak of the Greek Civil War in 1946 resulted in a monarchist victory in the 1946 referendum and the return of George II to the country.

The last king, Constantine II, interfered in politics during the Apostasia of 1965. The resulting political crisis led to a military coup in April 1967. Constantine II reluctantly accepted the fait accompli and lent it legitimacy, but when he tried to stage a counter-coup later that year, he was defeated and forced into exile. Greece formally remained a monarchy until it was abolished by the military junta in June 1973, followed by a July referendum confirming that decision. The restoration of the monarchy was overwhelmingly defeated, after constitutional legality was restored, by a free referendum in 1974.

Spain 

In Spain, the monarchy was again abolished in 1931 by the Second Spanish Republic (1931–1939). In 1947, Francisco Franco declared Spain a monarchy but kept himself as regent for life with the constitutional setup essentially unchanged. Per the right the 1947 law granted him to decide who would be the future Spanish monarch, he appointed Juan Carlos of Bourbon his successor in 1969. The "Prince of Spain" became king at Franco's death in 1975, and during the Spanish transition to democracy, the Spanish constitution of 1978 put the monarchy on a new constitutional basis. The existence of monarchy in Spain is an entrenched clause with much stricter rules for constitutional amendment than other constitutional provisions.

Portugal 

The monarchy of Portugal was also overthrown in 1910 (5 October), two years after the assassination of King Carlos I, ending the reign of Manuel II, who died in exile in England (1932), without issue.

Communism, socialism, and Islamism

Afghanistan 

In 1973, the monarchy of King Mohammed Zahir Shah of Afghanistan was abolished after a socialist-supported coup d'état led by Mohammad Daoud Khan, from the same Musahiban royal family, who declared himself the first President of Afghanistan.

Ethiopia 

Emperor Haile Selassie I was overthrown in 1974 as a result of the Ethiopian Revolution, ending almost 3000 years of monarchical rule in Ethiopia.

Indochina 

In 1945, during the August Revolution, Bảo Đại abdicated under the pressure of the Việt Minh led by Ho Chi Minh. This marked the end of the Nguyễn dynasty and the Vietnamese monarchy. From 1949 to 1955, Bảo Đại served as the Quốc Trưởng (lit. "Chief of State") of the State of Vietnam and did not receive the title of Hoàng Đế (lit. "Emperor").

Political upheaval and Communist insurrection put an end to the monarchies of Indochina after World War II: a short-lived attempt to leave a monarchical form of government in post-colonial South Vietnam came to naught in a fraudulent 1955 referendum, a military coup overthrew the kingless monarchy in Cambodia in 1970 and a Communist takeover ended the monarchy in Laos in 1975. Cambodia's monarchy later saw an unexpected rebirth under an internationally mediated peace settlement with a former king Norodom Sihanouk being restored as a figurehead in 1993.

Iran 

The monarchy of Iran was abolished by the Islamic revolution of 1979 overthrowing Shah Mohammad Reza Pahlavi though his son Reza Pahlavi, Crown Prince of Iran continued to function the monarchy in exile.

Sikkim 

King Palden Thondup Namgyal of Sikkim lost his throne in 1975 when the country became a state of India following a referendum.

Dictatorship

Egypt 

The monarchy of Egypt was abolished in 1953, after the revolution of 1952, which caused King Farouk I to abdicate in favor of his infant son Fuad II.

Tunisia 

The monarchy of Tunisia ended in 1957 when Muhammad VIII al-Amin lost his throne by decision of the Tunisian Parliament controlled by Habib Bourguiba

Iraq 

The monarchy of Iraq ended in 1958 when King Faisal II was killed and a republic proclaimed.

Yemen 

The monarchy of Yemen was abolished in 1962 when King Muhammad al-Badr was overthrown in a coup, although he continued to resist his opponents until 1970.

Libya 

King Idris of Libya was overthrown by a military coup led by Muammar Gaddafi in 1969.

Imperialism expansion and decolonisation

Commonwealth of Nations 

Many monarchies were abolished in the middle of the 20th century or later as part of the process of decolonization. The monarchies of India, Ghana, Nigeria, Kenya, Tanganyika, Uganda, Guyana, and Malawi were abolished shortly after they became independent of the United Kingdom, while remaining within the Commonwealth. The monarchy of Ireland was not abolished following the Irish war of independence in the 1920s. The Irish Free State was nominally a monarchy but transitioned towards more and more republican forms of government throughout its existence. The Irish Constitution that came into force in 1937 left the question of Republic or monarchy vague, but established a President of Ireland, an office usually absent in monarchies. The monarchy was officially abolished by the Republic of Ireland Act of 1948, which came into force in 1949. Some Commonwealth realms waited a little longer before abolishing their monarchies: Pakistan became a republic in 1956 and South Africa in 1961. Gambia abolished its monarchy in 1970 after a referendum in favour, while Sierra Leone became a republic in 1971, as did Sri Lanka in 1972, Malta in 1974, Trinidad and Tobago in 1976, and Fiji became a republic in 1987, thanks to two military coups by Sitiveni Rabuka. The latest country to become a republic within the Commonwealth was Barbados in 2021. With the exceptions of Ireland and India, in each case the deposed monarch was Elizabeth II.

Korea 

In 1910 the last emperor of Korea, Sunjong, lost his throne when the country was annexed by Japan. However, the Korean royal family was mediatized as a puppet family within the Japanese imperial family. Many of the Korean royals were forcibly re-educated in Japan and forced to marry Japanese royalty and aristocrats to meld the ruling families of the two empires. With the abolition of the Japanese aristocracy and cadet branches of the imperial family, the Korean royals officially lost their remaining status.

South Asia 

The independence of India from the United Kingdom in 1947 posed a unique problem. From 1858, when the British government replaced Company rule with direct Crown rule, it had been governed as a quasi-federation, with much of the country under the direct rule of the British monarch, who was styled as the Emperor of India. The remainder of the country, however, was under a form of indirect rule under him through its division into over 500 subnational monarchies, known as princely states; each was ruled by a prince who acknowledged the suzerainty of the Indian Emperor. The princely states ranged from powerful and largely independent principalities such as Hyderabad or Mysore, with a high level of autonomy, to tiny fiefdoms a few dozen acres (in the low tens of hectares) in size.

In 1947, it was agreed that India would be partitioned into the independent British dominions of India and Pakistan, with the princely states acceding to one nation or the other. The accession process proceeded smoothly, with the notable exception of four of the most influential principalities. The Muslim ruler of the Hindu-majority state of Junagadh acceded to Pakistan, but his decision was overruled by the Indian government, while Hyderabad chose to be independent, but was forcibly annexed to India in 1948. The Hindu ruler of Jammu and Kashmir, among the largest and most powerful of the principalities, but with a Muslim-majority population, initially held off on a decision. In the autumn of 1947, an invading force from Pakistan frightened the ruler into acceding to India. The ruler of Kalat, in Baluchistan, declared his independence in 1947, after which the state was forcibly merged with Pakistan, resulting in an insurgency persisting to this day. With the promulgation of the Indian constitution in 1950, India abolished its monarchy under the British crown and became a Republic within the Commonwealth of Nations, followed by Pakistan in 1956; as a result of both developments, the majority of the princes formally lost their sovereign rights. A few remaining principalities in Pakistan retained their autonomy until 1969 when they finally acceded to Pakistan. The Indian government formally derecognized its princely families in 1971, followed by Pakistan in 1972.

21st century

Nepal 
The Kingdom of Nepal was transformed into a Republic by the 1st Nepalese Constituent Assembly in 2008.

Barbados 

Barbados abolished the Monarchy of Barbados and became a republic on November 30, 2021 via constitutional amendment by the Parliament.

Monarchism in former monarchies 

In a referendum in Brazil in 1993, voters rejected an attempt to restore the country's monarchy. Unsuccessful efforts to restore the monarchies of some of the Balkan states in the former Eastern Bloc continue. Former King Michael of Romania and Prince Alexander of Serbia had been allowed to return, gained some popularity, played largely apolitical public roles, but never came close to being restored to their ancestral thrones. However, in Bulgaria, Simeon Saxe-Coburg-Gotha, who was deposed from the Bulgarian throne in 1946, was elected and served as the Prime Minister of his country from 2001 to 2005. The only formerly socialist country to have held a referendum on the monarchy was Albania where the claimant to his father's throne, the self-styled Leka I, lost by a 2/3 majority, though it was later revealed upon Leka's death in 2011 by the Albanian government that the referendum had been rigged in favour of the republic.

New monarchies in the 20th century 

The 20th century also saw the formation of a number of new monarchies that still exist to this day such as Bhutan (1907), Jordan (1921), Saudi Arabia (1932), and Malaysia (1957).

Summary table since the 20th century

Monarchies that were abolished, restored, and continue to exist in the 21st century 

Many other monarchies continue to exist in the 21st century, never having been abolished.

See also 
Alliance of European Republican Movements
Criticism of monarchy
Democratization
List of Abdications by Date
List of countries by date of transition to republican system of government
List of last scions
List of monarchy referendums
List of monarchs who lost their thrones before the 17th century
List of monarchs who lost their thrones in the 17th century
List of monarchs who lost their thrones in the 18th century
List of monarchs who lost their thrones in the 19th century
List of former sovereign states
List of political systems in France
Debate on the monarchy in Canada
Republicanism in the United Kingdom
Republicanism in Norway
2009 Saint Vincent and the Grenadines constitutional referendum
2008 Tuvaluan constitutional referendum

Notes

References 

Monarchy
Republicanism
Monarchy